Even Kruse Skatrud (born 18 August 1977) lecturer at the University of Oslo, a Norwegian Jazz musician, composer, Music arranger and Orchestra leader. He is the son of musician Harry Andersen and Marit Skatrud Andersen, married to singer-artist Anine Kruse Skatrud and son-in-law of the major Norwegian Contemporary composer Bjørn Kruse (b. 1946).

Career 

He studied music and composition at Norges Musikkhøgskole (from 1998) and contributed on a series of productions with orchestras like Funky Butt, Gumbo, Erik Smith's Friends, Soulslave, Descarga, Soul Inc, Ensemble Denada, Marinemusikken, Kringkastingsorkesteret, Kristiansand Symphony Orchestra and the originale "The Glenn Miller Orchestra".  He has played with musicians like Phil Woods, Marilyn Mazur, Ray Anderson, Bobby Stewart, Eddie Daniels og Clarence Clemons, contributed to TV-shows like three Idol-orchestres (TV 2, 2003–05) and four seasons with Skal vi danse (TV 2), and solo performances with Oslo Philharmonic.

In 2003 he appeared on the album Angels with the Sigurd Køhn and Nils-Olav Johansen Sextet, and joined the brass section of the band Horndogs in 2005. Jens Petter Antonsen wanted to start up a brass section and got into contact with Kruse Skatrud and Børge-Are Halvorsen. From 2005 they have participated on several albums.

In 2006 he wrote an arrangement on Odd R. Antonsen Big Band Album – where Putte Wickman (1924–2006) on Clarinet and Grethe Kausland (1947–2007) on Vocals were among the soloists involved. This was the last recording of each of them on a record. This arrangement with Grethe Kausland was also played at her funeral – the title was: "Here's to life" – a celebration of life.

In 2008 he wrote 4 of the arrangements for Kjell Karlsen's Big Band Recording  In Grieg Moods – Ved Rondane, Anitras dans, I Dovregubbens hall and a composition of Kjell Karlsen performed by Bjørn Johan Muri.
In 2011 he played with Bergen Big Band.

Skatrud established the new Norwegian fusion band Moose Patrol together with guitarist Markus Lillehaug Johnsen. They have composed new original music for the DølaJazz, Lillehammer Jazzfestival 2016. There they gave the audience a real treat with the additional lineup Mathias Eick and Jens Petter Antonsen (trup ets), Atle Nymo (saxophone), Jørn Øien (keyboards), Audun Erlien (bass), Torstein Lofthus (drums), Martin Windstad (perkusjon).

Events 
2008 – Kruse Skatrud conducted his first military band, on tour with divisjonsmusikken in Harstad.
2008 – Skatrud started giving lectures at Blinderen on the discipline of arranging (UiO).
2010 – Gumbo made a 5-week tour in Asia – one week in Guanshow, one week in Shang-hai, three weeks in India.
2010 – Took over as conductor of the Romsås Janitsjar
2011 – Employed at the University of Oslo, Norway as Assistant Professor, where he teaches jazz arranging.

Productions

Conductor 
Lørenskog Kavalkaden 2004
Telenors Kulturprogram og Kulturpris 2008 – You can't stop the beat – + musicians from Montenegro
Nordeas Kulturprogram 2009 – 2010  – Trine Rein – Quincy Jones Tribute

Musician 
Eveneven Big Band, Eveneven (Eveneven publishing, 2006)
Whoopin 2001 – Funky Butt
The Glove 2004 – Funky Butt
Big Mama 2005 – Funky Butt
Shakin da butt 2007
Rock i fullt alvor – Imperceptible Shattering of Innocence 1993 – bass Guitar
Mye rart på Romerike 1997 – trombonist in Romerike All-stars
Lasse Thoresen – Som bølger på et hav – 2000 – trombonist
The Real Thing – Deluxe 2000 – trombonist
Dollie De luxe – Dollie's beste 2001 – trombonist
Shire – Car 2001 – trombonist
Motorpsycho – Phanerothyme 2001 – trombonist
Asgeir – Sjefen over alle sjefer 2001 – trombonist
Molo 2002 – Rockeband – trombonist
Fabel – Smil 2002 – trombonist
Trollhalen – Lisbeth Nygård 2003 – trombonist
Amund Maarud 2003 – trombonist
Trumpet Jungle 2003 – trombonist
Number Seven Deli 2003 – trombonist
Køhn/Johansen – Angels 2003 – Flugabone og trombone
Børre Dalhaug's Bigbandblast! 2004 – trombonist
Kor 90 & Funky Butt – Shout all over god's heaven 2004 – trombonist
Margarets 2005 – trombonist
Dodo Miranda – 2005 – trombonist, arranger
Eveneven Big Band 2006
Gumbo 2006
Pitsj 2006

Arranger 
Norske Store Orkester – DENADA 2006
Antonsen Big Band 2007 -"Here's to life" with Grethe Kausland
Alejandro Fuentes – Tomorrow only knows 2007 – trombonist
Jørn Hoel – På Grunn av Dæ 2007 – trombonist
Marian Aas Hansen – It's beginning to look a lot like christmas 2007 – trombone row in the big band
Kyss meg – Vilde Bjerke 2008 – trombonist
Kjell Karlsens Storband – In Grieg Moods. 2008

Trombonist and arranger 
Gospelkoret HIM – Mighty in the spirit 2009 – trombonist
Gospelkoret HIM – Juleplate 2010 – trombonist
Helge Sunde's Ensemble Denada 2009 – Lead trombone – won the Echo-prize Deutscher Musikpreis Jazz 2010
Maria Mohn 2009 – trombonist
Ole Børud – Keep Movin'- 2011

DVD releases 
Idol 2003
Idol 2004
Idol 2005
A Night of Gospel – 2008

References

External links 
Bergen Big Band ~ Even Kruse Skaterud ~ Bergen JazzForum on YouTube
mic Bransjeregister

20th-century Norwegian trombonists
21st-century Norwegian trombonists
Norwegian jazz trombonists
Male trombonists
Norwegian jazz composers
Academic staff of the University of Oslo
Norwegian Academy of Music alumni
Musicians from Oslo
Living people
1977 births
21st-century trombonists
Male jazz composers
20th-century Norwegian male musicians
21st-century Norwegian male musicians
Ensemble Denada members
Funky Butt (band) members